This is a list of protests in Nigeria.

References 

Protests in Nigeria
Protests in Africa